
Year 628 (DCXXVIII) was a leap year starting on Friday (link will display the full calendar) of the Julian calendar. The denomination 628 for this year has been used since the early medieval period, when the Anno Domini calendar era became the prevalent method in Europe for naming years.

Events 
 By place 

 Byzantine Empire 
 Spring – Byzantine–Sassanid War: Emperor Heraclius issues an ultimatum for peace to King Khosrow II, but he refuses his generous terms. The war-weary Persians revolt against Khosrow's regime at Ctesiphon, and install his son Kavadh II on the throne on February 25. He puts his father to death and begins negotiations with Heraclius. Kavadh is forced to return all the territories conquered during the war. The Persians must give up all of the trophies they have captured, including the relic of the True Cross. Evidently there is also a large financial indemnity. Having accepted a peace agreement on his own terms, Heraclius returns in triumph to Constantinople.
 Third Perso-Turkic War: The Western Göktürks, under their leader Tong Yabghu Qaghan, plunder Tbilisi (modern Georgia). The Persian defenders are executed or mutilated; Tong Yabghu appoints governors (tuduns) to manage various tribes under his overlordship.

 Britain 
 Battle of Cirencester: King Penda of Mercia defeats the West Saxons at Cirencester (southwest England), in what later will be Gloucestershire. After reaching an agreement, he takes control of the Severn Valley and the minor kingdom of the Hwicce.

Central America
February 5 – K'ak' Chan Yopaat, who had been the ruler of the Mayan city state of Copán in Honduras, dies after a 49 year reign that began in 578.

February 21 – Chan Imix K'awiil, becomes the new ruler of the Mayan city state of Copán in Honduras, and rules until his death 67 years later in 695.

 Persia 
 February 25 – Khosrow II, the last great shah of the Sasanian Empire, is overthrown by his son Kavad II.
 September 6 – Ardashir III, age 7, succeeds his father Kavad II as the twenty-fourth shah of the Sasanian Empire on the latter's death from the plague that is devastating western Persia.

 Arabia 
 Muhammad, Islamic prophet, leads about 1,400 men on a pilgrimage to Mecca, where their passage is blocked. The Quraysh tribe and the Muslim community in Medina sign a 10-year truce (Treaty of Hudaybiyyah).

 By topic 
 Arts and sciences 
 Indian astronomer Brahmagupta writes the Brāhmasphuṭasiddhānta, an early, yet very advanced, mathematics book, including rules for computing with zero.

 Education 
 The Sharia enjoins women as well as men to obtain secular and religious educations. It forbids eating pork, domesticated donkey, and other flesh denied to Jews by Mosaic law (approximate date).

 Religion 
 Muhammad's letters to world leaders explain the principles of the new monotheistic Muslim faith, as they will be contained in   the Quran.
 Marutha of Tikrit is consecrated Maphrian of the East in the Syriac Orthodox Church.

Births 
 July 21 – Gao Zong, emperor of the Tang dynasty (d. 683)
 John Maron, Syriac monk and patriarch (d. 707)
 Approximate date
 Benedict Biscop, Anglo-Saxon abbot (d. 690)
 Gertrude of Nivelles, Austrasian abbess (d. 659)

Deaths 
 January 22 – Anastasius of Persia, monk
 February 28 – Khosrow II, king of the Persian Empire
 April 15 – Empress Suiko of Japan
 June 3 – Liang Shidu, rebel leader
 Babai the Great, church father and theologian
 Du Yan, chancellor of the Tang dynasty
 Kavadh II, king of the Sasanian Empire
 Li Dashi, Chinese official and historian (b. 570)
 Shirin, wife of Khosrow II (approximate date)
 Suibne Menn, High King of Ireland
 Theodelinda, queen of the Lombards
 Tong Yabghu Qaghan, ruler of the Göktürks

References

Sources